Vasiliy Yershov (15 August 1949 – 6 November 2000) was a Ukrainian javelin thrower who competed in the 1976 Summer Olympics for Soviet Union. Yershov tested positive for anabolic steroids at the 1978 European Athletics Championships and was subsequently banned from sport for 18 months.

References

1949 births
2000 deaths
Doping cases in athletics
Soviet sportspeople in doping cases
Ukrainian sportspeople in doping cases
Ukrainian male javelin throwers
Olympic athletes of the Soviet Union
Athletes (track and field) at the 1976 Summer Olympics
Soviet male javelin throwers
Universiade medalists in athletics (track and field)
Universiade gold medalists for the Soviet Union
Medalists at the 1977 Summer Universiade